Hemo Prova Borbora Girls' College, established in 1969, is a women's general degree college situated in Golaghat, Assam. This college is affiliated with the Dibrugarh University. This college offers bachelor's degree courses in arts.

References

External links
http://hpbgirlscollege.edu.in/

Women's universities and colleges in Assam
Colleges affiliated to Dibrugarh University
Educational institutions established in 1969
1969 establishments in Assam